Rex Aubrey Harrison (27 June 1914 – 26 June 1996) was an Australian rugby league player who played in the 1930s and 1940s.

Background
Harrison was born in Adelaide, South Australia on 27 June 1914.

Playing career
Harrison was graded with North Sydney in 1934 and played eleven seasons with them from 1934-1942 and 1945–1946. Rex was an excellent five-eighth and represented N.S.W. City Firsts on three occasions in 1939,1941 and 1942. He also represented New South Wales on ten occasions between 1938–1941.

World War Two curtailed his Rugby League career and he was never able to represent Australia. He enlisted in the Australian Army in 1942 and attained the rank of corporal. He was discharged from active duty in 1945. He rekindled his career at North Sydney at the end of 1945, and played almost the entire 1946 season until he broke his collarbone in the second last game.

Coaching career
He then retired as a player, although he went on to coach the minor grades at Norths with success, and was later promoted to first grade coach in 1954. Again he found success, taking the first grade team to the finals for the first time in a number of years.

Harrison died on 26 July 1996, aged 82.

References

1914 births
1996 deaths
Australian rugby league coaches
Australian rugby league players
City New South Wales rugby league team players
New South Wales rugby league team players
North Sydney Bears coaches
North Sydney Bears players
Rugby league five-eighths